The Nordenskiöld Archipelago or Nordenskjold Archipelago is a large and complex cluster of islands in the eastern region of the Kara Sea.

There are about 90 cold, windswept and desolate islands in this archipelago. These are mainly formed by igneous rocks and are covered with tundra vegetation. Except for two polar stations, one which was permanent in Russky Island between 1935 and 1999 and a temporary one in Tyrtov Island (Tyrtova) (1940-1975), there is no permanent human presence in any island of the archipelago.

Geography
The average elevation of the islands is relatively low. The highest point of the archipelago (107 m) is located in Chabak, one of the islands of the Vilkitsky subgroup. Some of the islands have wetlands.

The climate in the Nordenskiöld Archipelago is Arctic and severe. The sea surrounding the multitude of island groups is covered with fast ice in the winter and it is obstructed by pack ice even in the summer, which lasts only about two months in a normal year.

This island group belongs to the Taymyrsky Dolgano-Nenetsky District of the Krasnoyarsk Krai administrative division of Russia.

Islands
The Nordenskiöld Archipelago has been divided for geographical purposes into groups. The main ones are from west to east:

Tsivolko Islands
The Tsivolko Islands (острова Циволько; Ostrova Tsivolko)  is the westernmost group.

Krasin Island, named after icebreaker Krasin, the biggest island in the group.
Lenin Island
Yermak Island
Kuchum Island
Sadko Island
Schultz Island
Mametkul Island
Vitte Island (Lemeshok)
Kovalevsky Island
Ukromny Island
Brandwacht Island
Savvy Loshkin Island
Vasilyev Island 
Gryada Island
Kazak Island
Ledokol Island
Makarov Island
Oktyabr Island

Vilkitsky Islands
The Vilkitsky Islands (острова Вилькицкого), also known as 'Dzhekman Islands' , located north of the Matisen Strait. 

Novyy Island (New Island)
Strizhev Island
Chabak Island, the biggest and highest island in the group.
Tsentralny Island (Central Island)
Korsar Island
Opasnyye Islands, group of small islets
Grozny Island (Terrible Island)
Tugut Island
Pet Island 
Smezhny Island
Shvetsov Island
Dzhekman Island
Kamenisty Island
Ovalny Island
Hovgaard Island (Khovgarda)
Herberstein Island (Gerbersteina)

Pakhtusov Islands
The Pakhtusov Islands (острова Пахтусова; Ostrova Pakhtusova) , located south of the Lenin Strait.

Alexandra Island
Pakhtusov Island
Shpanberg Island
Truvor Island 
Silach Island 
Petersen Island, largest island in the group.
Olyeg Island 
Dobrynia Nikitich Island 
Skudnye Island 
Zverolovny Island 
Granichny Island 
Navarin Island 
Yurt Island 
Kotovsky Island

Litke Islands
The Litke Islands (острова Литке; Ostrova Litke), . This group includes Russky Island (остров Русский; Ostrov Russkiy) . Located at the archipelago's northern end, this is the largest island of the Nordenskiöld group.

Shileyko Island, close to Russky's southern coast
Torosny Island, with 42 m, the highest point in the subgroup
Sofii Island
Sikora Island
Unkovsky Island
Yermolov Island, large island, south of Shileyko
Pedashenko Island
Tribrata Island (Three Brothers Islands), a group of three small islands

Vostyochnyye Islands
The Vostyochnyye Islands (Восточные острова; Vostyochnyye Ostrova, "Eastern Islands"), latitude 76° 38' N and longitude 97° 30' E. This group includes the Kolomeitsev Islands (острова Коломейцева; Ostrova Kolomeytseva) .

Tyrtov Island, longest island of the group
Lovtsov Island
Zheleznyakov Island
Dezhnev Islands, small group of two islands
Matros Island, 54 m high rocky island
Salome Island
Volna Island (Wave Island)
Yevgeny Fyodorov Islands, group of two relatively large islands
Nord Island, named after ship Nord of the Russian Hydrographic Department.
Bianki Island
Leskinen Island
Dalniy Island
Priemny Island, the easternmost island of the archipelago

Coastal islands
The southern extension of the wider archipelago, consisting of the islands located south of the Matisen Strait near and around Taymyr Island. Kolchak Island, located further south, is not geographically part of the Nordenskiöld Archipelago in the strict sense.

Taymyr Island, the largest island of the coastal group
Bonevi Island
Nansen Island, a large island
Pravdy Island
Vkhodnoy Island
Nablyudeniy Island
Bliznetsy Islands
Rifovyy Island
Nizkiy Island
Moiseyev Island
Lafetnyye Islands
Ledyanyye Islands
Skalistyye Island
Rozmyslov Island
Malyy Island
Serp i Molot Island
Zvezda Island
Pilot Alexeyev Island
Pilot Makhotkin Island, a large island with a very indented coastline
Siversiy Island

History

This archipelago was first reported in 1740 by Nikifor Chekin, who accompanied Semion Chelyuskin in the Great Northern Expedition. Many years later it was named after arctic explorer Adolf Erik Nordenskiöld by Norwegian polar explorer Fridtjof Nansen in his maps of the northern coasts and seas of Siberia.

In 1893, when Fridtjof Nansen's Fram was near the Nordenskjold Archipelago, it got stuck in dead water. This is a strange phenomenon that typically occurs in fjords, as glaciers melt and a form a shallow layer of freshwater ice over salty water. 
This is how Nansen described the phenomenon:

In 1900 the islands of the Nordenskiöld Archipelago were explored and mapped with accuracy by Captain Fyodor Andreyevich Matisen during the Russian polar expedition of 1900–1902. This venture was led by Baron Eduard Von Toll on behalf of the Imperial Russian Academy of Sciences aboard ship Zarya. Toll sent Matisen to make a survey of the archipelago in the early spring while the Zarya was wintering close to Taymyr Island. Most islands of the Nordenskiöld Archipelago were charted and named during this effort. Matisen crisscrossed the whole vast frozen area on dogsled twice. He divided the archipelago into four of the five main groups mentioned above and named more than forty islands.

Like Nansen, Eduard Toll observed that it was difficult to navigate through the archipelago on account of the ice.

After the Russian Revolution, the archipelago was explored in the 1930s by a Soviet expedition on the icebreaker Sedov.

In 1937 the Arctic Institute of the USSR organized an expedition on ship Toros. The purpose of this  expedition was to explore the Nordenskiöld Archipelago and to thoroughly investigate the Northern Sea Route in the Kara Sea. The Toros overwintered in Ledyanaya Bay on Bonevi Island west of Taymyr Island and sailed back to Archangelsk during the summer thaw after having explored many Kara Sea islands.

On 25 August 1942, during Operation Wunderland, Kriegsmarine cruiser Admiral Scheer fell upon the Russian icebreaker Sibiryakov (under the command of Captain Kacharev) off the northwest coast of Russky Island at the northern end of the Nordenskiöld Archipelago. The Sibiryakov resisted but was sunk by the German warship. Then Admiral Scheer headed southwest in order to attack the Soviet military installations at Dikson.

Since May 1993 the Nordenskiöld Archipelago is part of the Great Arctic State Nature Reserve, the largest nature reserve of Russia. The Arctic station at Russky Island was closed in 1999.

See also
 Fyodor Andreyevich Matisen
 Icebreaker Sedov
 List of islands of Russia
List of research stations in the Arctic
 Nansen's Fram expedition
 Operation Wunderland

References

Bibliography
 Valerian Albanov, In the Land of the White Death, 2001. Contains pictures of Fridtjof Nansen's early Arctic maps.

External links 

 The Nordenskiöld Archipelago; Ousland 

 
Archipelagoes of the Arctic Ocean
Archipelagoes of the Kara Sea
Archipelagoes of Krasnoyarsk Krai
Uninhabited islands of Russia